{{DISPLAYTITLE:C17H27NO2}}
The molecular formula C17H27NO2 (molar mass: 277.40 g/mol, exact mass: 277.204179 u) may refer to:

 ICI-118,551
 Padimate O
 PNU-99,194
 RDS-127
 Venlafaxine

Molecular formulas